Oleh Skvira (born 23 June 2000) is a Ukrainian professional football player.

References

External links
 
 
 

2000 births
Living people
Ukrainian footballers
Ukrainian expatriate footballers
Expatriate footballers in Belarus
Association football midfielders
FC Energetik-BGU Minsk players
FC Volyn Lutsk players